These are the results for the mixed team event at the 2018 Summer Youth Olympics.

Results

Teams

Final standings

References
 Draw

Judo at the 2018 Summer Youth Olympics
Youth Olympics, 2018